Leonard James Burt, CVO, CBE (1892–1983) was a British police officer, involved in several high-profile cases and investigations.

Life

Burt was born on 20 April 1892 in Totton in Hampshire the son of Charles Richard Burt and his wife Sarah Mary Sparks. Leonard joined the London Metropolitan Police in 1912.

In May 1938, Suffolk businessman William Murfitt was murdered by poisoning at his home in Risby, Suffolk. Burt was one of a pair of detectives sent from Scotland Yard to investigate the sensational murder. However, the killer was never caught, although the case was solved 60 years later by investigative journalist David Williams.

On 16 June 1945, as a Commander in the Metropolitan Police Special Branch, Burt was assigned to accompany two war-time traitors, John Amery and William Joyce (also known as "Lord Haw-Haw") back to London to be tried for treason, after their capture in Germany. They were flown back in a Douglas Dakota with three armed troops as escort.

On 2 February 1950, Burt arrested German atomic spy Klaus Fuchs, who was charged under the Official Secrets Act with espionage for passing British and American atomic secrets to the Soviet Union. Burt was also involved in the investigations into other spies such as Alan Nunn May.

Burt wrote an autobiography entitled Commander Burt of Scotland Yard, published in 1959.

He was a close friend of Leon Bachelier and used to go motor racing with him at Brooklands.

He died in Fulham on 3 September 1983.

Family

In 1917 he married Grace Airey.

References
Citations

Bibliography

Williams, David John. Poison Farm: A Murderer Unmasked After 60 Years. Thorogood Publishing, 2005.
Stephen's Study Room: British Military & Criminal History in the period 1900 to 1999 - Klaus Fuchs
Love and treachery, The Daily Telegraph, 9 May 2005

1892 births
1983 deaths
Metropolitan Police chief officers
Commanders of the Royal Victorian Order
Commanders of the Order of the British Empire